Deven Sharma (born 1956 in Jharkhand) is an Indian businessman.

Biography

Early life and education 
Sharma attended De Nobili School, FRI, Digwadih, Dhanbad. He received his Bachelor's Degree from Birla Institute of Technology, Ranchi, India, a Master's Degree from University of Wisconsin–Milwaukee and a Doctoral degree in Business Management from Ohio State University.

Career 
He was named president of Standard & Poor's in August 2007. In August 2011, he announced that he would step down from the position of president later in the year.

Sharma serves on the boards of CRISIL, The US-China Business Council and Asia Society Business Council. He served as a Director of 1-800-Flowers.com Inc. from May 12, 2005 to March 16, 2007.

Deven Sharma became the public face of the firm in the wake of its downgrade of the United States' long-term debt rating on 5 Aug 2011. According to Reuters News Service, S&P announced on August 23, 2011 that Deven Sharma would step down as a Chief of Standard & Poor's effective September 12, 2011, and would leave the company by the end of the year.

References

External links 
 Standard & Poor's, Management Bios
 Profile at SEC Roundtable
 
 Business profile at Bloomberg Businessweek
 When Wall Street Nearly Collapsed, Deven Sharma, CNN Money, 2009
 Deven Sharma to head S&P, Corbet quits
 “Why Ratings Requirements Don’t Make Sense” WSJ 2010, Op-Ed by Deven Sharma
 “Q.&A. With S&P’s President on the State of Ratings” NYT 2010

De Nobili Schools alumni
University of Wisconsin–Milwaukee alumni
Ohio State University Fisher College of Business alumni
Living people
American financiers
American people of Indian descent
American Hindus
Birla Institute of Technology, Mesra alumni
1956 births
People from Bihar
People from Dhanbad
American chief executives